Karanisia is an extinct genus of strepsirrhine primate from middle Eocene deposits in Egypt.

Classification 
Two species are known, K. clarki and K. arenula.  Originally considered a crown lorisid, more comprehensive phylogenetic analyses suggest it is a more basal to crown lorisiformes.

K. clarki was described in 2003 from isolated teeth and jaw fragments found in Late Middle Eocene (c. 40 million years ago) sediments of the Birket Qarun Formation in the Egyptian Faiyum. The specimens indicate the presence of a toothcomb, making it the earliest fossil primate to indisputably bear this trait, which is unique to all living strepsirrhines (lemurs, lorises, and galagos).

In 2010 a second species, K. arenula, was described in the journal Nature from Late Middle Eocene rocks in Libya.

References

Prehistoric strepsirrhines
Eocene primates
Prehistoric primate genera
Fossil taxa described in 2003
Eocene mammals of Africa